Ichneutica falsidica is a moth of the family Noctuidae. This species is endemic to New Zealand and is widespread in the South Island but can only be found in the Tararua Range and Mount Taranaki in the North Island. This species is similar looking to I. panda but I. falsidica has dark dashes on their hind-wings. This species can be found open high country and has been seen flying during the day in sunny warm weather. At night adults are attracted to light. The life history of this species is unknown as are the host species of the larvae.

Taxonomy
I. falsidica was first described by Edward Meyrick in 1911 using a female specimen collected at Mt Arthur and named Hyssia falsidica. The holotype specimen is held at the Natural History Museum, London. In 1913 George Hampson also described the same species, using specimens including the  lectotype male that was collected in the Tararua Range, and named it Hyssia hamiltoni. In his 1988 catalogue, J. S. Dugale stated that this species was placed within the Aletia genus and assigned to it two subspecies Aletia falsidica falsidica and Aletia falsidica hamiltoni. In 2019 Robert Hoare undertook a major review of New Zealand Noctuidae. During this review the genus Ichneutica was greatly expanded and the genus Aletia was subsumed into that genus as a synonym. As a result of this review, this species is now known as Ichneutica falsidica.

Description 

Meyrick described the species as follows:

This species is variable in appearance. I. falsidica is similar in appearance to I. panda but the former usually has dark dashes along the hind-wings. I. panda is normally the smaller of the two species. The wingspan of I. falsidica males is between 37 and 42 mm and between 40 and 44 mm for females.

Distribution 
It is endemic to New Zealand. It is found in the North Island but only in the Tararua Range and Mount Taranaki. This species is also found in the South Island but is more common on the west side of that island.

Habitat 
In the South Island this species can be common in the alpine zone.

Behaviour 
Adults of this species are on the wing from January to March.  Adult moths have been seen flying during sunny days. This species is drawn to light.

Life history and host species 

The life history of this species is unknown. The host species of the larvae of I. falsidica are unknown.

References

Hadeninae
Moths of New Zealand
Endemic fauna of New Zealand
Moths described in 1911
Taxa named by Edward Meyrick
Endemic moths of New Zealand